The National Theater of China or National Theater Company of China, based in Beijing, is China's national theatrical company, founded on December 25, 2001 with the merger of China National Youth Theater and China National Experimental Theater. 

It is known for presenting China's best theatrical performances. In addition, its affiliated actors are considered among the best in China, including:

Male Actors

Chen Jianbin
Guo Tao
Jiang Wu
Liao Fan
Liu Peiqi
Liu Ye
Sun Honglei
Tong Dawei
Wang Ying
Wu Yue
You Yong
Zhang Fengyi
Zhou Jie

 Actresses

Chen Hong
Chen Shu
Ding Jiali
Hao Lei
Li Bingbing
Qin Hailu
Tao Hong (born 1969)
Tao Hong (born 1972)
Yuan Quan
Zhang Ziyi
Zhu Yuanyuan

References
 The National Theater Company of China at cultural-china.com

External links
  ntcc.com.cn (Official Site)

2001 establishments in China
Theatre companies in Beijing